Pennsylvania State University is a geographically dispersed university with campuses located throughout the Commonwealth of Pennsylvania. While the administrative hub of the university is located at its flagship campus, University Park, the 19 additional commonwealth campuses together enroll 37 percent of Penn State's undergraduate student population.

Organization
Under the present administrative structure, enacted by the Penn State Board of Trustees in 2005, the 19 undergraduate campuses (not including University Park and Penn State's special-mission campus, the Pennsylvania College of Technology) are overseen by the Vice President for Commonwealth Campuses. Each campus is led by a chancellor who reports to the Vice President. (This position replaced the existing titles of campus dean and campus executive officer) 

All 19 campuses are considered part of Penn State's Commonwealth campus system, and all offer Penn State baccalaureate degrees.  Five campuses are considered “college” campuses. Those five are Penn State Abington, Penn State Altoona, Penn State Berks, Penn State Behrend, and Penn State Harrisburg. The other fourteen campuses are referred to collectively as the "University College". These campuses, while having their own chancellor, also report to the Dean of the University College, a position concurrently held by the Vice President for Commonwealth Campuses.

List of Commonwealth campuses
The first two years of education for any Penn State major are available at all campuses; however, some majors can be completed only at specific campuses.

Notes

See also 
 Pennsylvania State System of Higher Education

References

 
 
Campuses of Penn State  Accessed 23 November 2005

External links
 Office of the Vice President for Commonwealth Campuses

 
Satellite campuses